Orchid International College , commonly known as (OIC), is an Information Technology (IT), Management college in Nepal. It was established in the year 2010 AD.The college is located at Bijayachwok-Gaushala, Kathmandu. The college currently offers Information technology, Management and Social Work courses at the Bachelor's levels. It is affiliated with the Tribhuvan University.

Location
Orchid International college is located in Bijayachwok-Gaushala, Kathmandu.

Courses offered
The college offers courses in Undergraduate programs
 Bachelor of Science in Information Technology (BSc.CSIT) 
 Bachelor in Information Management (BIM)
 Bachelor of Arts in Social Work (BSW)

Admission
BSc CSIT

Must have passed +2 or equivalent degree with minimum second division from science stream. 
Must have passed in the entrance exam taken by Institute of Science and Technology, Tribhuvan University. (Entrance forms are available in college)

BIM

 Must have passed +2 or equivalent degree with minimum second division.
 Must have passed in the CMAT exam taken by Faculty of Management, Tribhuvan University. (CMAT forms are available in college)

BSW
Only those are eligible to study BSW, students who have completed +2 from any stream 
.
 Interested eligible students have to apply for admission and have to appear in interview taken by college.

References

External links
Official website

Universities and colleges in Nepal
2010 establishments in Nepal